***

People
 Margo (actress) (1917–1985), Mexican-American actress and dancer
 Margo (magician), American magic performer and actress
 Margo (singer), Irish singer
 Margo (given name), including a list of people and characters with the name

Places and jurisdictions 
 1175 Margo, an outer main-belt asteroid discovered in 1930
 Dashti Margo, a desert in Afghanistan
 Margo, Nicosia, a former village west of Pyrogi, Northern Cyprus
 Margo, Saskatchewan, Canada

Other uses 
 Margo (soap), an Indian brand of herbal soap
 Margo, a compact version of Margolin MCM pistol
 , a United States Navy patrol boat in commission from 1917 to 1918
 Margo (fly), an African genus of flies

See also 
 Margaux (disambiguation)
 Margot (disambiguation)
 Marguerite (disambiguation)
 Margaret